Michael Beckley is an Australian actor. He has worked with major theatre companies in both Australia and the United Kingdom, and appeared on London's West End in A Few Good Men (starring Rob Lowe) and Cabaret (directed by award-winning director Rufus Norris). He is probably best known for playing Rhys Sutherland, the patriarch of a new family that arrived in the fictional town of Summer Bay in the internationally televised series Home and Away (2000 – 2004).

Before and since leaving the soap he has worked extensively in theatre.

He moved to London in 2005, where he was based until 2016, appearing on the West End and with major UK theatre companies. He now resides in Sydney, Australia.

Career
Beckley decided on an acting career just before completing his senior high school studies. Despite protests from teachers he left school one week before his final exams, apparently to force himself onto a certain path. A week later – at 17 years of age – he had landed a permanent position on the Entertainment Staff at Old Sydney Town, an historical theme park near his home town of Gosford, NSW. This was a recreation of Sydney around the year 1800. Here he earned his Actors Equity of Australia card and officially became a working actor. Within two years he took over the role of Town Crier, the leading player for the park.

Beckley made his first permanent move to the UK in 1984. He appeared on the London Fringe in All The Way Home and attended dozens of plays in and around London, including many on the West End starring actors such as Anthony Hopkins (Pravda) and Glenda Jackson (Phaedra) and many leading actors of the day. He also took drop-in acting classes at the London Actors' Centre studying Chekhov, Shakespeare, comedy, voice and movement. It was during this time in London that he decided to commit to his decision to be an actor.

On returning to Australia in late 1986 he auditioned for Australia's leading drama school NIDA (National Institute of Dramatic Art) but was not accepted. He went and studied part-time under Gillian Owen, a RADA-trained actor, who ran The Sydney Acting School, and then auditioned for NIDA again in late 1987. He was accepted.

The next three years saw him studying full-time at NIDA. (Alumni include Miranda Otto, Jacqueline McKenzie, Jeremy Sims and the writer Reg Cribb.)

With just one week to go – echoing his departure from high school – Beckley was approached by Wayne Harrison, then artistic director of Sydney Theatre Company, to appear as Frid in that company's production of Sondheim's A Little Night Music. (He appeared opposite a then unknown Toni Collette as Petra.) With the school's blessing, Beckley began his post-student career a week earlier than expected and graduated with his class at the official ceremony in early 1991.

The next few years saw Beckley work for various companies in a range of projects. These included a rigorous 6-month T.I.E. (theatre in education) tour for the Bell Shakespeare Company which Beckley still considers as "earning one's stripes". Other cast members were Berynn Schwerdt, Colleen Cross and Julia Zemiro (now a household name on Australian televisions).

Small television roles started to appear on his CV between theatre jobs. He had guest roles on the Australian police series Water Rats and the Australian/American sci-fi series Farscape.

Wayne Harrison invited him back to the STC to appear in Antony and Cleopatra starring theatre stars Sandy Gore and John Stanton. The prestigious Griffin Theatre Company cast him in Clark in Sarajevo and then as the leading role of Dave in Neil Cole's play Alive at Williamstown Pier, the true story of a politician's fight with bipolar disorder and his consequent "outing" by the Australian media. Beckley received strong praise for his portrayal from national critics. The Australian Jewish News called his work "virtuoso". Lydia Clifford of The Daily Telegraph writing "I felt privileged to be a spectator of emerging talent".

It was shortly after this that Beckley was cast as Rhys Sutherland in the long-running television program Home and Away, where he stayed for just over four years (2000–2004). His character arrived with a wife and three daughters. The Sutherlands went on to be one of the most popular families to ever appear on the program. While on the show, the production company made two specials for release on DVD: Hearts Divided and Secrets and the City, the latter film concerning Rhys's disappearance after the revelation of a previous affair. Each special contained not-to-be-televised footage, a new concept that proved a success.

Upon leaving Home and Away Beckley returned to England in 2005. Signing with a London agent, he booked his first audition, which found him playing Capt. Roger Wittaker at the Theatre Royal Haymarket on London's West End. The play starred Rob Lowe in the role made famous by Tom Cruise in the film version, which was also written by Aaron Sorkin. Sorkin was very much involved in the casting process. The play ran for several months and was a major success in that year's West End calendar.

Beckley was soon cast in David Pownall's play Masterclass for Derby Theatre playing Joseph Stalin's right-hand man Andrei Zhdanov, alongside Christopher McKay (Me and Orson Welles), Russell Dixon and Terry Mortimer. McKay and Mortimer, accomplished pianists, played a real grand piano in their respective roles of Shostakovich and Prokofiev. Beckley was also required to play some Chopin while seemingly drunk on vodka, a moment in the play that terrified him each night. Although a pianist, he was not as accomplished as McKay and Mortimer. Nonetheless, reviews were exceptional, with most of the London papers including it in their must-see lists.

Beckley continued to enjoy a run of successful and critical theatre roles. He returned to the West End for nearly a year to play Ernst Ludwig in Rufus Norris' wildly successful Cabaret at the Lyric Theatre on Shaftesbury Avenue. He played leading man Matt Holden in Chris England's play Breakfast With Jonny Wilkinson for the (then newly successful) Menier Chocolate Factory and would reprise the role in the film version in 2012.

One of Beckley's major roles was that of Randle P McMurphy in One Flew Over The Cuckoo's Nest, based on the novel by Ken Kesey, made particularly famous by the film version starring Jack Nicholson (as Randle P McMurphy). The production was staged by Curve in Leicester, with Catherine Russell as Nurse Ratched. Beckley did not even audition for McMurphy but for the role of Dale Harding. However, after the casting process director Michael Buffong decided Beckley was the right man for the part and offered it to him. During the run of Cuckoo's Nest, Curve's artistic director Paul Kerryson offered Beckley the role of Bradley in Sam Shephard's Pulitzer Prize-winning Buried Child. It starred Olivier Award-winner Matthew Kelly as Dodge. Bradley, the semi-psychotic, one-and-a-half-legged amputee' remains one of Beckley's favourite roles.

Kelly and Beckley would work together again in the 5-star hit production of Chekhov's The Seagull for Southward Playhouse in London in 2012. (Beckley credits a student production of this play at NIDA, seen in 1979, as being his catalyst for thinking about acting as a career.) The Southwark Playhouse production also featured a then-unknown Lily James as Nina. (Lily went on to play Cinderella in the 2015 Disney live-action film version of Cinderella). The season was a sell-out.

Derby Theatre asked him back to play Joe Josephson in Sondheim's Merrily We Roll Along. Menier Chocolate Factory also cast him again in The Invisible Man. The prestigious York Theatre Royal cast him as leading character Dr Robert Smith in the highly acclaimed play Blue/Orange.

Beckley also spent three years (2009, 2014, 2015) travelling to 30 countries in the role of Bill Austin in the world-wide hit musical 'Mamma Mia!'. It was at the end of his last year with that show that he decided to return to Australia, where he has been since early 2016.

Since returning to his native country Beckley has appeared on the television programs Here Come The Habibs, Doctor Doctor, The Secret Daughter and House of Bond, as well as the new Australian musical Melba based on the life of opera star Dame Nellie Melba (played by international opera star Emma Matthews).

In 2019, Beckley appeared in the Opera Australia/Handa Opera on Sydney Harbour production of West Side Story as Officer Krupke ... the titular character of that show's famous comedy number 'Gee, Officer Krupke'. The production was directed by multi-award-winning director Francesca Zambello. Her assistant and choreographer was Julio Monge. It was Beckley's first appearance with Opera Australia.

Directing 
Michael Beckley was resident director on The Rocky Horror Show for Australian and New Zealand tours during the 1990s. He began in the chorus as a Phantom and then became Dance Captain. After the first one-year tour, director Nigel Triffitt offered Beckley the position of assistant director for the show's New Zealand tour. This position was changed to Resident Director when the show began a new Australian tour starring Jason Donovan in Perth.

Triffitt also used Beckley as his assistant for a revival of his 1990 Melbourne International Arts Festival hit production of Moby Dick for Sydney Theatre Company in 1998.

Beckley continued to direct through the late 1990s on shows such as The Seventh Knob (Belvoir St Theatre, downstairs), Leader of the Pack (Laycock St Theatre, Gosford, 1996, return season 1997), Damn Yankees (full charity fund-raiser production, 1999) and assisted Jeremy Sims on the hugely successful Pork Chop production of Rosencrantz and Guildenstern Are Dead (Belvoir St Theatre, upstairs) and then again on the same company's production of Hamlet, again at Belvoir St Theatre. Beckley also directed The Players for Pork Chop Productions at The Stables Theatre in Sydney.

Filmography

Theatre
 2019 Officer Krupke in West Side Story for Opera Australia/Handa Opera on Sydney Harbour, Sydney
2017 David Mitchell in Melba by Nicolas Christo and Johannes Luebbers, Hayes Theatre, Sydney
2014/15 Bill Austin in Mamma Mia! by Catherine Johnson, International Tour / Little Star
2012 Shamreyev in The Seagull by Anton Chekhov, at Southwark Playhouse, London
2012 Robert in Blue/Orange by Joe Penhall, at the York Theatre Royal
 2011 Bradley in Buried Child by Sam Shepard, at the Curve in Leicester
 2011 Randall McMurphy in One Flew Over the Cuckoo's Nest adapted by Dale Wasserman, at the Curve in Leicester
 2010 Cuss/Fearenside in The Invisible Man adapted by Ken Hill, at the Menier Chocolate Factory
 2009 Bill Austin in Mamma Mia! by Catherine Johnson, International Tour / Little Star
 2008 Ernst Ludwig in Cabaret by Christopher Isherwood, with Bill Kenwright Ltd
 2007 Joe Josephson in Merrily We Roll Along (musical) by George Furth and Stephen Sondheim, at the Derby Theatre
 2006 Matt in Breakfast with Jonny Wilkinson at the Menier Chocolate Factory
 2005 Roger Wittaker in A Few Good Men (play) by Aaron Sorkin
 2005 Narrator/Detective in Bill with Short and Sweet Productions
 2005 Emil in The Duck Variations by David Mamet with Pork Chop Productions
 1999 Dave in Alive at Williamstown Pier with Griffin Theatre Company
 1998 Various in Clark in Sarajevo with Griffin Theatre Company
 1997 Polonius in Rosencrantz and Guildenstern Are Dead by Tom Stoppard with Pork Chop Productions
 1996 Eddie/Dr Scott in The Rocky Horror Show with Dainty Consolidated Ent
 1994 Angus Marius in Dylan with Illustrious Theatre Company
 1993 Maecenus in Antony and Cleopatra by William Shakespeare with Sydney Theatre Company
 1993 Pete in Three More Sleepless Nights with NIDA Theatre Company
 1991 Frid in A Little Night Music by Stephen Sondheim and Hugh Wheeler with the Sydney Theatre Company

References

External links
 
Michael Beckley at michaelbeckley.net

Australian male television actors
Living people
West End theatre
Farscape character redirects to lists
British theatre people
1965 births